The V Corps of the Grande Armée was a French military unit that existed during the Napoleonic Wars. The corps was originally formed in 1805 and was reorganized several times until it was dissolved in 1814.

History
From 1805–1807, the corps composed mostly of French troops, and was commanded by Marshals Jean Lannes, Édouard Mortier, François Joseph Lefebvre, and André Masséna as well as Général de Division Anne Jean Marie René Savary.

Polish Corps d'Armée
In 1812, the V Corps was made up entirely of Polish soldiers from the Duchy of Warsaw under the command of General Józef Poniatowski. It was one of several non-French corps of the Grande Armée and at its peak consisted of around 36,000 soldiers. The corps took part in Napoleon's invasion of Russia and fought in the Battle of Smolensk and the Battle of Borodino.

The corps suffered heavy casualties during the retreat, but managed to reach Warsaw and was later reinforced with new recruits. In 1813, the corps was sent to Saxony, passing Bohemia. The corps was temporary disbanded with the remaining troops and Poniatowski reassigned to the VIII Corps.

Revival
After the disastrous Russian campaign, the V Corps was rebuilt in Magdeburg from newly formed French units in the spring of 1813. These troops were under the command of General Jacques Lauriston. Participating in the War of the Sixth Coalition the corps was disbanded again after Napoleon's abdication.

Organization
The V Corps varied in strength and organization. In the beginning of each campaign it had:
 14,000 French in 1805
 18,000 French in 1806–1807
 36,000 Polish in 1812
 20,000 French in 1813

1805
 Infantry Division – General Louis-Gabriel Suchet
 Combined Grenadier Division – General Nicolas Oudinot
 1st Brigade under Général de Brigade Mortièret
 2éme Régiment d'Infanterie de Ligne
 9éme Régiment d'Infanterie de Ligne
 11éme Régiment d'Infanterie de Ligne
 58éme Régiment d'Infanterie de Ligne
 81éme Régiment d'Infanterie de Ligne
 2nd Brigade
 2éme Régiment Légère
 3éme Régiment Légère
 28éme Régiment Légère
 31éme Régiment Légère
 3rd Brigade
 12éme Régiment Légère
 15éme Régiment Légère
 Light Cavalry Division – General Anne-François-Charles Trelliard, then Antoine Charles Louis de Lasalle

1806–1807
 Infantry Division – General Louis-Gabriel Suchet
 Infantry Division – General Gazan
 Light Cavalry Division – General Trelliard

1812
 16th Infantry Division – General Józef Zajączek, then Izydor Krasinski and Franciszek Paszkowski
 17th Infantry Division – General Jan Henryk Dąbrowski
 18th Infantry Division – General Ludwik Kamieniecki, then Karol Kniaziewicz
 Cavalry Division – General Michal Ignacy Kamieński

1813
 16th Infantry Division – General Nicolas Joseph Maison
 17th Infantry Division – General Jacques-Pierre-Louis Puthod
 19th Infantry Division – General Marie Joseph Rochembeau

References

Sources
 
 Town notes of Strasbourg
 Letters of Napoleon
Couderc Napoléon, ses dernières armées page 504 Bis, situation V Corps on 26 April 1815

1805 establishments in France
GAI05
Duchy of Warsaw
Military history of Poland
Military units and formations established in 1805